Fabrizio Del Rosso (born 25 May 1963) is an Italian former footballer who serves as assistant manager of Lecce

Career statistics

Club

Notes

References

1963 births
Living people
Italian footballers
Italian football managers
Association football forwards
Casale F.B.C. players
ACF Fiorentina players
A.C.R. Messina players
Cosenza Calcio players
Catania S.S.D. players
Cavese 1919 players
Montevarchi Calcio Aquila 1902 players
A.C. Prato players
Serie B players
Italian expatriate sportspeople in China
Expatriate football managers in China